The 2014 Nova Scotia Scotties Tournament of Hearts, the provincial women's curling championship for Nova Scotia, was held January 7 to 12 at the Sydney Curling Club in Sydney.  The winning team of Heather Smith represented Nova Scotia at the 2014 Scotties Tournament of Hearts in Montreal.

Teams

Round-robin standings
Final round-robin standings

Round-robin results

Draw 1
Wednesday, January 8, 1:00 pm

Draw 2
Wednesday, January 8, 7:00 pm

Draw 3
Thursday, January 9, 1:00 pm

Draw 4
Thursday, January 9, 7:00 pm

Draw 5
Friday, January 10, 1:00 pm

Draw 6
Friday, January 10, 7:00 pm

Draw 7
Saturday, January 11, 9:00 am

Playoffs

Semifinal
Saturday, January 11, 7:00 pm

Final
Sunday, January 12, 2:00 pm

External links
Official site

Sport in the Cape Breton Regional Municipality
Nova Scotia
Curling in Nova Scotia
Scotties Tournament of Hearts
Nova Scotia Scotties Tournament of Hearts